Ruby Bay is a settlement in the Tasman District of New Zealand's upper South Island. It is located between Māpua and Tasman on Te Mamaku / Ruby Bay. Ruby Bay was named after small 'rubies' (red chert) found within the moutere gravel.

Demographics

It had a population of 678 at the 2018 New Zealand census, an increase of 57 people (9.2%) since the 2013 census, and an increase of 123 people (22.2%) since the 2006 census. There were 249 households. There were 327 males and 351 females, giving a sex ratio of 0.93 males per female, with 105 people (15.5%) aged under 15 years, 66 (9.7%) aged 15 to 29, 330 (48.7%) aged 30 to 64, and 171 (25.2%) aged 65 or older.

Ethnicities were 95.1% European/Pākehā, 6.2% Māori, 1.3% Pacific peoples, 0.9% Asian, and 3.5% other ethnicities (totals add to more than 100% since people could identify with multiple ethnicities).

Although some people objected to giving their religion, 62.4% had no religion, 27.9% were Christian, 0.4% were Buddhist and 2.2% had other religions.

Of those at least 15 years old, 183 (31.9%) people had a bachelor or higher degree, and 75 (13.1%) people had no formal qualifications. The employment status of those at least 15 was that 237 (41.4%) people were employed full-time, 93 (16.2%) were part-time, and 9 (1.6%) were unemployed.

Ruby Bay is part of the Ruby Bay-Māpua SA2 statistical area.

References

Populated places in the Tasman District
Populated places around Tasman Bay / Te Tai-o-Aorere